The 1953 Oregon State Beavers football team represented Oregon State College in the Pacific Coast Conference (PCC) during the 1953 college football season.  In their fifth season under head coach Kip Taylor, the Beavers compiled a 3–6 record (3–5 in PCC, sixth), and were outscored 187 to 39. OSC opened with five shutout losses,  then visited and shut out the Idaho Vandals 19–0 for their first points and win.

The Beavers played two home games at Multnomah Stadium in Portland and opened the new Parker Stadium in Corvallis on November 14 with a 7–0 homecoming win over Washington State, then won their fifth consecutive Civil War game over Oregon, this year on the road in Eugene.

Schedule

References

Oregon State
Oregon State Beavers football seasons
Oregon State Beavers football